South Central Pennsylvania is a region of the U.S. state of Pennsylvania that includes the fourteen counties of Adams, Cumberland, Dauphin, Franklin, Huntingdon, Juniata, Lancaster, Lebanon, Mifflin, Perry, Snyder, and York. Portions of western Schuylkill and southern Northumberland counties are also located in South Central Pennsylvania. 

Despite the designation South Central Pennsylvania, many of the counties are geographically located in the southeastern portion of the state. Lancaster, with a population of 59,322, is the largest city in the region, and the second largest metropolitan area. Harrisburg, with a population of 49,528, is the second largest city in the region, and has the largest metropolitan area with a population of 643,820 people, and is the capital of Pennsylvania. York is the other significant city in the region. The Harrisburg-Lancaster-York television market, which includes Adams, Cumberland, Dauphin, Franklin, Juniata, Lancaster, Lebanon, Mifflin, Perry, and York counties is the 58th largest market in the U.S.

Description 
South Central Pennsylvania is notable for its large Amish and Mennonite populations in its rural areas, but the area also has significant African American and Puerto Rican populations in many of its urban cities, particularly York, Harrisburg, Lancaster, and Lebanon.

Beginning in the late 1600s and the 1700s, the area was initially settled by (and remains largely composed of) mostly Protestant ethnic groups, particularly ethnic German, Dutch, English, Scottish, and Ulster Scots populations. The late 19th and 20th century saw an increase in immigrants from Ireland, Italy, and parts of Southern Europe and Eastern Europe, with many of these more recent immigrants and their descendants concentrated in the region's urban and industrial centers. Many residents of the southern portion of this area commute to Baltimore especially from York County.

The area is home of the Pennsylvania state capital; being the site of the bloodiest battlefield of the Civil War, and being the home of Hershey's chocolate and the York Peppermint Pattie.  South Central Pennsylvania has also hosted two former capitals of the United States during the American Revolution: Lancaster and York.  The region is drained primarily by the Susquehanna River, flowing southwards to Chesapeake Bay and further to the Atlantic Ocean.

Government 

South Central Pennsylvania contains the Pennsylvania State Capitol Complex, the headquarters for State Government.

Distinctiveness

 The South Central Pennsylvania region is the site of the first paved highway in the United States, the Philadelphia and Lancaster Turnpike, connecting the cities of Philadelphia and Lancaster.
 Milton Hershey began his milk chocolate manufacturing in Lancaster, and later to the town of Hershey. South Central Pennsylvania is still the corporate headquarters of The Hershey Company and possesses many smaller chocolate manufacturers like Wilbur and Wolfgang.  The York Peppermint Pattie was originally manufactured in the city of York, but was purchased by Hershey's.
 The Hershey Bears, named for The Hershey Company, are the oldest team in the American Hockey League.
Snyder's of Hanover is from Hanover, York County PA, though it was merged into Snyders-Lance and subsequently into Campbell Soup Co., remaining headquartered in Hanover.
Rite-Aid was formerly headquartered in Camp Hill, Cumberland County.
 South Central Pennsylvania is the home of the largest Amish population in the United States, mostly in Lancaster County, with also a fairly large population within the Kishacoquillas Valley in Mifflin and Huntingdon Counties.  Many tourists visit the region to see and learn about the Amish.
 Gettysburg was the site of the bloodiest battle of the Civil War, and is now Gettysburg National Military Park.
 York was the site of the signing of the Articles of Confederation and was the largest town in the North to be occupied by the Confederate Army during the Civil War.
 Lititz a small town and a suburb of Lancaster, which was listed as Budget Travel's 2013 "Coolest Small Town in America," is home to the historic Wilbur Chocolate Company and the Sturgis Pretzel House (both originating back in the mid 1800s).

Dialect

Certain inhabitants of South Central Pennsylvania speak with the Susquehanna dialect.  The Susquehanna dialect incorporates influences from the Philadelphia accent and that of Pennsylvania Dutch English, and is found throughout the region, especially among older generations of citizens. Here is a list of common words and phrases unique to the Susquehanna dialect:

 Redd up- to straighten up, (I redd up the house yesterday.)
 Macadam- asphalt, influenced by the original macadam roads in Pennsylvania, (Jason scraped his knee on the macadam.)
 Dippy eggs- fried eggs, sunny side up
 ..awhile- used at the end of a sentence, signifying 'in the meantime' (Can I take your drink orders awhile?)
 ..once (or wunst)- used at the end of a sentence, signifying 'quickly' or 'for just a moment' (Come here once.)
 Outen the lights- turning the lights off, (You need to outen the lights, John.)
 It's all- it is all gone, (The coffee is all.)
 Furhuddled- disheveled, (Patrick appeared furhuddled at his job interview.)
 Rutsching- wriggling, restless, (Timmy, quit your rutsching around...sit still!)
 Yous(e)/You'ins- plural of you, (Yous coming to dinner on Sunday?)
 Spritzing- lightly raining, (It ain't raining hard, it's only spritzing.)
 Needs Fixed- Needs to be fixed, (That broken door needs fixed awhile.)
 Doplic - lacking dexterity, (He'll never be a good basketball player; he's too doplic.)
 Schnutz- mucus (or "schnutzy" for mucus-y) (He has schnutz all over his face.) (He's all schnutzy.)

The Central Pennsylvania accent is commonly spoken in the western and northern counties of the South Central Pennsylvania region.

Film

The most significant film set in the region is the 1985 film Witness starring Harrison Ford, Danny Glover, Alexander Godunov, Kelly McGillis, and Viggo Mortensen.  It was set in and filmed in the borough of Strasburg and the village of Intercourse, both in Lancaster County.

The film Lucky Numbers starring John Travolta and Lisa Kudrow was filmed throughout Harrisburg and Palmyra, and was based on the 1980 Pennsylvania Lottery scandal. Its screenplay was written by Harrisburg native Adam Resnick.

The movie Girl, Interrupted, starring Angelina Jolie and Winona Ryder, was filmed in Mechanicsburg, as well as at the Harrisburg State Hospital in Harrisburg. Mechanicsburg was chosen for its old fashioned appearance and its old-fashioned drug store simply titled "Drugs," all of which gave the film its time-dated appearance.

The Strasburg Rail Road in Lancaster County simulated scenes of Springfield, Illinois for The Assassination of Abraham Lincoln, by the Public Broadcasting Service, and for Stealing Lincoln's Body by The History Channel.  The Woodward Hill Cemetery and the Landis Valley Museum were also used to simulate the Oak Ridge Cemetery and other scenes of 1870s Springfield.

Scotland, PA, a modern retelling of Shakespeare's Macbeth, is set in Scotland, a small town in Franklin County (though it was not filmed there). Historically, Scotland, Pennsylvania was originally settled by Scots-Irish Americans, and there are still people named McBeth living in the area.

The Dean Martin and Jerry Lewis movie Hollywood or Bust shows an establishing shot (likely taken by a 2nd unit film crew) of the Laughlin Mill in Newville, Cumberland county.

Music

Music in the South Central Pennsylvania region varies from the popular genres such as Rock and roll, Hip hop, Jazz, Rhythm and blues, Country, etc. to the softer melodies of the Amish and Mennonites.  A few mainstream acts got their start in South Central Pennsylvania, such as the alternative rock quartet Live from York.  Another rock band called Fuel started off playing in local venues in Harrisburg.  The most famous bands from the region are the 1980s glam metal band Poison from Mechanicsburg and rock band Halestorm from Red Lion.

The region's Amish population inspired "Weird Al" Yankovic's 1996 parody of Coolio's Gangsta's Paradise called "Amish Paradise."  The accompanying music video featured Weird Al in typical Amish clothing, with traffic signs reading "Welcome to Lancaster."

"Emo rapper" Lil Peep was born in Allentown.

Sports

South Central Pennsylvania possesses a strong sporting tradition beginning at the youth level to the minor leagues.  The Hershey Bears, a regional team, are the oldest team of the American Hockey League and have won many of its championships.  Professional baseball has a strong presence in the South Central Pennsylvania region with three teams:  the Harrisburg Senators, the AA affiliate of the Washington Nationals; and the Lancaster Barnstormers and York Revolution of the Atlantic League of Professional Baseball.

The Barnstormers and the Revolution are geographical rivals, contending for the Community Cup, the trophy for the War of the Roses series.  As the Pennsylvania cities of Lancaster and York are named for the English cities of the same name, their former baseball teams possessed the names of the Lancaster Red Roses and the York White Roses, after the rival sides of the Wars of the Roses.

References

External links

 Hershey-Harrisburg Welcome Center 

Pennsylvania culture
Regions of Pennsylvania